The Chinese University of Hong Kong Press is the university press of the Chinese University of Hong Kong. It was established in 1977 and publishes more than 50 titles per year. Most works are on China, Hong Kong and the Chinese culture.

References

External links
 

University presses of Hong Kong